The 16th General Assembly of Nova Scotia represented Nova Scotia between 1830 and 1836.

The assembly sat at the pleasure of the Governor of Nova Scotia, Peregrine Maitland. Colin Campbell succeeded Maitland as governor in 1834.

Samuel George William Archibald was chosen as speaker for the house.

List of members

Notes:

References
Journal and proceedings of the House of Assembly, 1830 (1831)

Terms of the General Assembly of Nova Scotia
1830 in Canada
1831 in Canada
1832 in Canada
1833 in Canada
1834 in Canada
1835 in Canada
1836 in Canada
1830 establishments in Nova Scotia
1836 disestablishments in Nova Scotia